= Prolecon =

- Location within Gauteng Location within South Africa
- Coordinates: 26.219°S 28.087°E
- Country: South Africa
- Province: Gauteng
- Municipality: City of Johannesburg
- Main Place: Johannesburg

Area
  - Total: 3.85 km^{2} (1.49 sq mi)

Population (2011)
  - Total: 35
  - Density: 9.1/km^{2} (24/sq mi)

Racial makeup (2011)
  - Black African: 91.4%
  - Indian/Asian: 2.9%
  - White: 5.7%
- Time zone: UTC+2 (SAST)
- Postal code (street): 2001

Prolecon is a suburb of Johannesburg, South Africa. It is located in Region F of the City of Johannesburg Metropolitan Municipality.
